Mental Health Awareness Month (also referred to as "Mental Health Month") has been observed in May in the United States since 1949. The month is observed with media, local events, and film screenings.

Mental Health Awareness Month began in the United States in 1949 and was started by the Mental Health America (MHA) organization (then known as the National Association for Mental Health). Each year in mid-March Mental Health America releases a toolkit of materials to guide preparation for outreach activities during Mental Health Awareness Month. During the month of May, MHA, its affiliates, and other organizations interested in mental health conduct a number of activities which are based on a different theme each year.

Themes from recent years include:

The purpose of Mental Health Awareness Month is to raise awareness and educate the public about: mental illnesses, such as the 18.1% of Americans who suffer from depression, schizophrenia, and bipolar disorder; the realities of living with these conditions; and strategies for attaining mental health and wellness. It also aims to draw attention to suicide, which can be precipitated by some mental illnesses.  Additionally, Mental Health Awareness Month strives to reduce the stigma (negative attitudes and misconceptions) that surrounds mental illnesses.  The month came about by presidential proclamation.

Mental Health America is not the only organization to run campaigns throughout May. Many other similar organizations choose to host awareness observances that coincide with Mental Health Awareness month. National Children's Mental Health Awareness Day is one such campaign. This event is sponsored by the Substance Abuse and Mental Health Services Administration in partnership with other non-profit and advocacy organizations.

Other months and weeks throughout the year are designated to raise awareness around specific mental health conditions or the mental health of different demographic groups (Minority Mental Health Month, Mental Illness Awareness Week, National Depression Screening Day, etc.).

See also
 National Child Traumatic Stress Network (NCTSN)
 Mental Illness Awareness Week (USA, first week of October)
 Mental Health Week, in Australia
 World Mental Health Day (October 10)

References

External links
 Mental Health America
 National Alliance for Mental Illness (NAMI)
 Brain & Behavior Research Foundation
 National Institute of Mental Health
 National Federation of Families for Children's Mental Health

May observances
Health observances
Disability observances
Mental health in the United States
Observances in the United States
Awareness months